Justicia purpusii is a species of flowering plant in the Acanthus family commonly known as Purpus' hummingbird flower or chuparosa. This shrub is characterized by long orange-red tubular flowers that bloom from November to April. It is endemic to the Cape region of Baja California Sur, Mexico, where it is found growing in tropical deciduous forest and thorn scrub in canyons and along wet slopes. It is similar to its more northern relative adapted to drier climates, Justicia californica. Phylogenetic analysis has shown that both species are closely related and form a clade.

Description 
This species is a shrub covered in tomentose and villous hairs throughout. The foliage consists of opposite ovate to elliptic leaves with mostly entire margins. The upper leaves gradually have shorter petioles until they become sessile cordate to broadly ovate bracts. These bracts are broader than they are long and have a clasping base.

Emerging from the axils of the bracts are the flowers. The seeds are ash-colored, nearly spherical, and rugose on the sides.

This species can be distinguished from its close relative Justicia californica by the flowers that emerge from larger, persistent bracts and its non-tropical distribution. J. californica meanwhile is restricted to more arid, desert climates and has small, insignificant bracts and shorter calyx lobes.

Distribution and habitat 
This species is endemic to the Cape region of Baja California Sur, Mexico, the southernmost part of the Baja California peninsula.

References

External links 

 Justicia purpusii at SEINet
 Justicia purpusii — UC Photo gallery

purpusii
Flora of Baja California Sur
Natural history of Baja California Sur
Natural history of the Peninsular Ranges
Endemic flora of Mexico
Taxa named by Townshend Stith Brandegee